Gardenia scabrella is a flowering evergreen tropical plant found in northern Queensland. It is used in street and amenities planting in Cairns, Queensland.

External links

scabrella
Gentianales of Australia
Endemic flora of Queensland
Garden plants
Taxa named by Christopher Francis Puttock